"Town of Tuxley Toymaker, Part One" is a song written by Barry, Robin and Maurice Gibb in Australia in 1966. It was recorded by Jon Blanchfield in 1966, Billy J. Kramer in 1967 and Shane (New Zealand) in 1968.

It was recorded first by Jon Blanchfield. His version was only released in Australia as a B-side of the A-side single "Upstairs, Downstairs", a song also written by Barry, Robin and Maurice. The song was recorded in November or December 1966 at St. Clair Studio, Hurstville in Australia. Blanchfield also adds that Barry wrote "Coalman" around the same time. The melody was inspired by "Matchmaker" from Fiddler on the Roof. It was released as a single in February 1967, when the Bee Gees were in England, and they recorded another version of the song with Billy J. Kramer. The Gibb brothers also participated on this song. The Blanchfield version was included on the various artists compilation called Assault The Vaults: Rare Australian Cover Versions Of The Brothers Gibb.

Billy J. Kramer version
Kramer's version was recorded on 4 March 1967, the Gibb brothers with Colin Petersen. It was also the Bee Gees' first recording session, after they returned in England, the song was recorded at IBC Studios. and Kramer recalled:

Shane version
New Zealand singer Shane Hales, using his stage name Shane, released a version on the Zodiac label in 1968.

Personnel
The musicians played on the Jon Blanchfield recording were:
 Jon Blanchfield — lead vocals
 Barry Gibb — guitar, background vocals
 Robin Gibb — background vocals
 Maurice Gibb — bass, piano, guitar (12-string)
 Uncredited — drums, horns
 Ossie Byrne — engineer
 Nat Kipner — producer
The musicians played on the Billy J. Kramer recording were:
 Billy J. Kramer — lead vocals
 Barry Gibb — background vocals
 Robin Gibb — background vocals
 Maurice Gibb — background vocals
 Colin Petersen — drums
 Bill Shepherd — orchestral arrangement

References

1967 songs
Songs written by Barry Gibb
Songs written by Robin Gibb
Songs written by Maurice Gibb
Song recordings produced by Robert Stigwood
1967 singles
Reaction Records singles